Prestonville is an unincorporated community in Stokes County, North Carolina, United States, approximately five miles northeast of county seat Danbury, at the junction of State Highways 704 and 772.

Unincorporated communities in Stokes County, North Carolina
Unincorporated communities in North Carolina